Anthracology (from anthrax (ἄνθραξ), the Greek word for coal) is the analysis and identification of charcoal which is preserved after carbonization, based on wood anatomy. The remains of carbonized wood come from archaeological sites and sediments, and may yield evidence of natural or anthropogenic paleo-fires. Anthracological studies are also applied to extant material, such as the inspection of charcoal of illegal provenance. The discipline was started in Brazil by Rita Scheel-Ybert in the late 1990s, but the identification of species from carbonized wood dates from the end of the 19th century. The working methods back then (based on the preparation of thin sections) were difficult and time-consuming, and research did not have a paleo-environmental approach. From the 1970s on, the use of reflected light microscopes, mainly from France by Professor Jean-Louis Vernet, allowed the multiplication of anthracological analysis, prompting the appearance of paleo-ecological studies. Anthracological analyses in Southern Brazil and in the Central Amazon have extended the knowledge of early settlements, their environmental resources and fuel economy, and the use of wood in ritual contexts. The conservation of carbonized fruits, seeds, roots and tubers has furthered the knowledge of diet and food production issues.

Background
Anthracology is a privileged study method for Archaeology. Archaeological sediments are usually very rich in charcoal fragments, which identification provides interpretations on the landscape, paleovegetation, relations between humans and their environment, and plants use by ancient populations. Besides the paleoenvironmental perspective that allows the reconstitution of past plant formations and, therefore, of the paleoclimate, this discipline offers important palaeoethnobotanical information regarding the utilization of wood in everyday basis and also in rituals, including also the subsistence of ancient populations, by means of conservation of carbonized dietary remains.

The anthracological analysis of archaeological charcoal is already largely acknowledged as a reliable tool for palaeoenvironmental reconstruction. The development of this discipline, in Brazil, has been marked by a strong preoccupation with the definition of appropriate methodologies, seeking both palaeoenvironmental and palaeoethnobotanical information that are committed to archaeological issues.

Anthracological analyses in sambaquis and Tupi-Guarani sites on Southern and Southeastern Brazil, as well as in ceramic sites in Central Amazon, have been essential to broaden our knowledge about the landscape in the areas where such settlements were established, the environmental resources, site catchment area, fuel economy, and use of wood in quotidian and ritual contexts. More recently, anthracological analysis has proven itself an important tool to support archaeological interpretation, helping to elucidate site formation processes and providing more consistent information on the sites functional aspects.

Besides that, the conservation of carbonized fruits, seeds, and underground organs remains (roots and tubers) have enabled the approaching of diet and food production issues.

Anthracology and dendrology

Dendrology studies associated to anthracological analyses make possible to estimate the minimum diameter of charred woods on the basis of the angulation of the rays. The first studies on this research line took place on the Black Forest, in Germany, where it was possible to recognize the effect of anthropical activities on the forest structure and composition (Ludemann, 2002, 2008; Ludemann & Nelle, 2002; Ludemann et al., 2004; Nelle, 2002).

Geoanthracology

The study of charcoal of sedimentary origin (soils, paleosoils or sedimentary deposit) provides essentially palaeoenvironmental information, allowing the reconstitution of previous vegetation and palaeoclimate. Important information on the relations between past vegetation, forest fires, and climate changes are being obtained from several studies performed in Europe and North America.

In Brazil, anthracological analyses coupled with the study of the isotopic composition of the soil at the state of São Paulo made possible to establish that the climate of that region was drier during the beginning of the Holocene and moister right after that period, as it is nowadays, from ca. 3000 years BP (Scheel-Ybert et al., 2003).

Legal control of charcoal production

Anthracological studies may also be used for conservationist and technological approaches, as in detecting species of illegal provenience and determining charcoal quality. The use of Anthracology in Brazil as a tool to identify and, therefore, inspect and control charcoal production has important conservationist character since the country is the world's main charcoal producer. Although such charcoal (which is mainly destined for the steel industry) may be regarded as renewable energy, its environmental impact is actually strong, since a huge part of it is the result of illegal extraction from native forests.

References 
 Asouti, E. 2003. Woodland vegetation and fuel exploitation at the prehistoric campsite of Pinarbasi, south-central Anatolia, Turkey: the evidence from the wood charcoal macro-remains. Journal of Archaeological Science 30: 1185–1201.
 Badal, E.; Bernabeu, J. & Vernet, J.-L. 1994. Vegetation changes and human action from the Neolithic to the Bronze Age (7000–4000 BP) in Alicante, Spain, based on charcoal analysis. Vegetation History and Archaeobotany 3: 155-166.
 Beauclair, M. 2010. Produção de carvão vegetal e mudanças na paisagem do Maciço da Pedra Branca, Rio de Janeiro, RJ. Dissertação (Mestrado em Geografia) – Pontifícia Universidade Católica do Rio de Janeiro.
 Beauclair, M.; Rangel, A.; Oliveira, R.R. & Scheel-Ybert, R. 2011. Wood charcoal production and forest dynamics in the Pedra Branca Massif, Rio de Janeiro, RJ, Brazil. Saguntum 11: 121-122.
 Beauclair, M.; Scheel-Ybert, R.; Bianchini, G.F. & Buarque, A. 2009. Fire and ritual: bark hearths in South-American Tupiguarani mortuary rites. Journal of Archaeological Science 36: 1409–1415.
 Bianchini, G.F. 2008. Fogo e Paisagem: Evidências de Práticas Rituais e Construção do Ambiente a Partir da Análise Antracológica de um Sambaqui no Litoral Sul de Santa Catarina. Dissertação (Mestrado em Arqueologia) Universidade Federal do Rio de Janeiro.
 Bianchini, G.F. & Scheel-Ybert, R. 2012. Plants in a funerary context at the Jabuticabeira-II shellmound (Santa Catarina, Brazil) – feasting or ritual offerings? Saguntum 11: 253-258.
 Bianchini, G.F.; DeBlasis, P.; Gaspar, M.D.; Scheel-Ybert, R. 2011. Processo de formação do sambaqui Jabuticabeira-II: interpretações através da análise estratigráfica de vestígios vegetais carbonizados. Revista do Museu de Arqueologia e Etnologia 21: 51-69.
 Bianchini, G.F.; Scheel-Ybert, R.; Gaspar, M.D. 2007. Estaca de Lauraceae em contexto funerário (sítio Jaboticabeira-II, Santa Catarina, Brasil). Revista do Museu de Arqueologia e Etnologia 17: 223-229.
 Breuil, H. 1903. Les fouilles dans la grotte du Mas d'Azil (Ariège). Bulletin Archéologique 421-436.
 Carcaillet, C., Thinon, M., 1996. Pedoanthracological contribution to the study of the evolution of the upper treeline in the Maurienne Valley (North French Alps): methodology and preliminary data. Review of Palaeobotany and Palynology 91: 399-416.
 Chabal, L. 1997. Forêts et Sociétés en Languedoc (Néolithique Final, Antiquité Tardive). L’Anthracologie, Méthode et Paleoécologie. Documents d’archéologie rançaise 63: 1-188.
 Damblon F. (ed.). 2013. Proceedings of the Fourth International Meeting of Anthracology. British Archaeological Records International Series 2486: 1-251.
 Deckers, K. & Hughes, P. 2010. Vegetation development in the Middle Euphrates and Upper Jazirah (Syria/Turkey) during the Bronze Age. Quaternary Research 74: 216-226.
 Di Piazza, A. 1998. Archaeobotanical Investigations of an Earth Oven in Kiribati, Gilbert Islands. Vegetation History and Archaeobotany 7: 49-154.
 Dufraisse A. & García Martínez M. S. 2011. Mesurer les diamètres du bois de feu en anthracologie. Outils dendrométriques et interprétation des données. Anthropobotanica 02: 1-18.
 Figueiral, I. 1995. Evidence from charcoal analysis environmental change during the interval late Bronze Age to Roman, at the archaeological site of Castro de Penices, N.W. Portugal. Vegetation History and Archaeobotany 4: 93-100.
 Figueiral I., Mosbrugger V., Rowe N.P., Utescher T., Jones T.P., Von Der Hocht F. 2002. Role of charcoal analysis for interpreting vegetation change and paleoclimate in the Miocene Rhine embayment (Germany). Palaios 17: 347–365.
 Fiorentino, G. & Donatella, M. 2008. Charcoals from the Past: Cultural and Palaeoenvironmental Implications. Oxford: British Archaeological Reports International Series 1807: 1-318.
 Gonçalves, T.A.P. & Scheel-Ybert, R. 2012. Contra o carvão : estudo da anatomia da madeira pode ajudar a salvar florestas nativas. Ciência Hoje 292: 74-76.
 Henry, A.; Valdeyron, N.; Bouby, L. & Théry-Parisot, I. 2012. History and evolution of Mesolithic landscapes in the Haut-Quercy (Lot, France): New charcoal data from archaeological contexts. The Holocene 23(1): 127-136.
 Ludemann, T. 2002. Anthracology and forest sites: the contribution of charcoal analysis to our knowledge of natural forest vegetation in south-west Germany. In: Thièbault, S. (ed.). Charcoal analysis: methodological approaches, palaeoecological results and wood uses. British Archaeological Reports International Series 1063: 209-217.
 Ludemann, T. 2012. Past fuel wood exploitation and natural forest vegetation in the Black Forest, the Vosges and neighbouring regions in western Central Europe. Palaeogeography, Palaeoclimatology, Palaeoecology 291: 154-165.
 Marguerie, D. ; Hunot, J.-Y. 2007. Charcoal analysis and dendrology: data from archaeological sites in north-western France. Journal of Archaeological Science 34: 1417–1433.
 Nelle, O. 2002. Charcoal burning remains and forest stand structure: examples from the Black Forest (south-west Germany) and the Bavarian Forest (south-east Germany). In: Thiébault, S. (ed.). Charcoal analysis: methodological approaches, palaeoecological results and wood uses. British Archaeological Reports International Series 1063: 201-207.
 Nelle, O.R. 2003. Woodland history of the last 500 years revealed by anthracological studies of charcoal kiln sites in the Bavarian Forest, Germany. Phytocoenologia 33(4): 667-682.
 Nelle, O.; Robin, V.; Brigitte T. 2013. Pedoanthracology: Analysing soil charcoal to study Holocene palaeoenvironments. Quaternary International 289: 1-4.
 Rubiales, J.M.; Hernández, L.; Romero, F. & Sanz, C. 2011. The Use of Forest Resources in Central Iberia during the Late Iron Age: Insights from the Wood Charcoal Analysis of Pintia, a Vaccaean Oppidum. Journal of Archaeological Science 38 (1): 1-10.
 Scheel-Ybert, R. 1998. Stabilité de l'Écosystème sur le Littoral Sud-Est du Brésil à l'Holocène Supérieur (5500–1400 ans BP): les pêcheurs-cueilleurs-chasseurs et le milieu végétal: apports de l'anthracologie. 1998. 245 p. Tese (Doutorado em Ecologia) – Universite de Montpellier II, Science et Tech du Languedoc, Montpellier, v. 1-3.
 Scheel-Ybert, R. 2000. Vegetation stability in the Southeastern Brazilian coastal area from 5500 to 1400 14C yr BP deduced from charcoal analysis. Review of Palaeobotany and Palynology 110 (2): 111-138.
 Scheel-Ybert, R. 2001a. Man and Vegetation in Southeastern Brazil during the Late Holocene. Journal of Archaeological Science 28 (5): 471-480.
 Scheel-Ybert, R. 2001b. Os sambaquieiros e o mundo vegetal: meio ambiente, utilização da lenho e alimentação. In: Congresso da Sociedade de Arqueologia Brasileira, 11., 2001, Rio de Janeiro. Resumos... Rio de Janeiro: SAB, v. 1, p. 1-17.
 Scheel-Ybert, R. 2004a. Teoria e métodos em antracologia. 1. Considerações teóricas e perspectivas. Arquivos do Museu Nacional 62(1): 3-14.
 Scheel-Ybert, R. 2004b. Teoria e métodos em antracologia. 2. Técnicas de campo e de laboratório. Arquivos do Museu Nacional 62(4): 343-356.
 Scheel-Ybert, R. 2005. Teoria e métodos em antracologia. 3. Validade amostral. Arquivos do Museu Nacional, Rio de Janeiro 63(2): 207-232.
 Scheel-Ybert, R. 2013. Antracologia: preservados pelo fogo. In M.D. Gaspar; S.M. Mendonça de Souza (eds.). Protocolos para pesquisas de campo em sambaquis. Erechin: Habilis
 Scheel-Ybert, R. & Solari, M.E. 2005. Macro-restos vegetais do Abrigo Santa Elina: Antracologia e Carpologia. In: Vilhena-Vialou, A. (ed.) Pré-história do Mato Grosso. I. Santa Elina. São Paulo, EDUSP. pp. 139–147.
 Scheel-Ybert, R. & Dias, O.F. 2007. Corondó: palaeoenvironmental reconstruction and palaeoethnobotanical considerations in a probable locus of early plant cultivation (south-eastern Brazil). Environmental Archaeology 12: 129-138.
 Scheel, R.; Gaspar, M.D. & Ybert, J.P. 1996.  anatomia dos carvões pré-históricos. Arqueologia encontra respostas em restos de fogueiras e incêndios florestais. Ciência Hoje 21(122): 66-69.
 Scheel-Ybert, R.; Gouveia, S.E. M.; Pessenda, L.C.R.; Coutinho, L. M. & Boulet, R. 2003. Holocene palaeoenvironmental evolution of the cerrado and semideciduous forest zone in the São Paulo State (Brazil), based on anthracology and soil d13C analysis. The Holocene 13 (1): 73-81.
 Scheel-Ybert, R.; Klökler, D.; Gaspar, M.D. & Figuti, L. 2006. Proposta de amostragem padronizada para macrovestígios bioarqueológicos: antracologia, arqueobotânica, zooarqueologia. Revista do Museu de Arqueologia e Etnologia 15-16: 139-163.
 Scheel-Ybert, R.; Carvalho, M.A.; Moura, R.P.O.; Gonçalves, T.A.P.; Scheel, M. & Ybert, J.-P. 2006. Coleções de referência e bancos de dados de estruturas vegetais: subsídios para estudos paleoecológicos e paleoetnobotânicos. Arquivos do Museu Nacional 64(3): 255-266.
 Scheel-Ybert, R.; Barros, L.H.P.; Carvalho, M.A. & Ramos, R.R.C. 2008a. Charcoalified wood remains from the Eocene of São José de Itaboraí Basin, Southeastern Brazil. In: IVth International Meeting of Anthracology. Programme and abstracts, p. 130.
 Scheel-Ybert, R.; Witovisk, L.; Machado, L.G.; Carvalho, M.A.; Ramos, R.R.C.; Coelho, J.S.; Barros, L.H.P.; Beauclair, M.; Kellner, A.W.; Riff, D.; Romano, P.S.; Grillo, O. & Silva, H.P. 2008b. Cretaceous fossil wood from James Ross Island, northeastern Antarctica Peninsula: a preliminary report. In: 8th International Organisation of Palaeobotany Conference, GeoUnion, p. 247.
 Scheel-Ybert, R.; Bianchini, G.F. & DeBlasis, P. 2009a. Registro de mangue em um sambaqui de pequeno porte do litoral sul de Santa Catarina, Brasil, a cerca de 4900 anos cal BP, e considerações sobre o processo de ocupação do sítio Encantada-III. Revista do Museu de Arqueologia e Etnologia, São Paulo, 19: 103-118
 Scheel-Ybert, R.; Eggers, S.; Wesolowski, V.; Petronilho, C.C.; Boyadjian, C.H.C.; Gaspar, M.D.; Barbosa-Guimarães, M.; Tenório, M.C. & DeBlasis, P. 2009b. Subsistence and Lifeway of Coastal Brazilian Moundbuilders. In: La Alimentación en la América Precolombina y Colonial: Una Aproximación Interdisciplinaria, edited by A. Capparelli, A. Chevalier and R. Piqué, 37-53. Treballs d’Etnoarqueologia 7.
 Scheel-Ybert, R.; Beauclair, M. & Buarque, A. 2014. The Forest People: Landscape and firewood use in the Araruama region (Southeastern Brazil) during the late Holocene. Vegetation History and Archaeobotany 23(2): 97-111.
 Solari, M.E. 1993. L’Homme et le bois en Patagonie et Terre de Feu au cours des six derniers millénaires: recherches anthracologiques au Chili et en Argentine. Thèse de Doctorat, USTL. Montpellier. 267 p
 Talon, B., Payette, S., Filion, L., Delwaide, A., 2005. Reconstruction of the longterm fire history of an old-growth deciduous forest in Southern Quebec, Canada, from charred wood in mineral soils. Quaternary International 64: 36-43.
 Tengberg, M. 2002.Vegetation history and wood exploitation in the Oman peninsula from the Bronze Age to the Classical period. In: Thiébault, S. (Ed.). Charcoal analysis: methodological approaches, palaeoecological results and wood uses. British Archaeological Reports International Series, Oxford, v. 1063, p. 151-158.
 Théry-Parisot, I; Chabal, L. & Chrzavzez, J. 2010. Anthracology and taphonomy, from wood gathering to charcoal analysis: a review of the taphonomic processes modifying charcoal assemblages, in archaeological contexts. Palaeogeography, Palaeoclimatology, Palaeoecology 291: 142-153.
 Thiébault, S. (Ed.). 2002. Charcoal analysis: methodological approaches, palaeoecological results and wood uses. British Archaeological Reports International Series, 1063: 1-284.
 Thiébault, S. 1997. Early-Holocene vegetation and the human impact in central Provence (Var, France): charcoal analysis of the Baume de Fontbrégoua. The Holocene 7 (3): 343-349.
 Vernet, J.-L. (org.). 1992. Les charbons de bois, les anciens écosystèmes et le rôle de l’homme. Actes du Colloque. Bulletin de la Société Botanique de France, Bulletin Sociéte Botanique Française, Paris, v. 139, p. 725.
 Vernet, J.-L. 1973. Étude sur l’histoire de la végétation du sud-est de la France au Quaternaire, d’après les charbons de bois principalement. Paléobiologie Continentale 4 (1): 1-90.
 Vernet, J.-L. 1977. Les Macrofossiles Végétaux et la Paléoécologie du Pléistocène. Bulletin de l’Association Française pour l’étude du Quaternaire Suppl 47:53-55.
 Vernet, J.-L. 1990. Man and Vegetation in the Mediterranean Area during the Last 20,000 Years. In: Biological Invasions in Europe and the Mediterranean Basin, edited by F. di Castri, A. J. Hansen and M. Debussche, 161-168. Dordrecht: Kluwer Academic Publishers.
 Vernet, J.-L.; Bazile, E. & Evin, J. 1979. Coordination des analyses anthracologiques et des datations absolues sur charbon de bois. Bulletin de la Société Préhistorique Française 76(3): 76-79.
 Vernet, J.-L.; Ogereau, P.; Figueiral, I.; Machado Yanes, C. & Uzquiano, P. 2001. Guide d'identification des charbons de bois préhistoriques et récents: Sud-Ouest de l'Europe: France, Péninsule Ibérique et Îles Canaries. Paris: CNRS editions. 395 p.
 Western, C. 1963. Wood and charcoal in archaeology. In: Brothwell, D. & Higgs, E. Science in Archaeology. A comprehensive survey of progress and research. Londres: Thames and Hudson. pp. 150‑162.
 Willcox, G.H. 1974. A History of Deforestation as Indicated by Charcoal Analysis of Four Sites in Eastern Anatolia. Journal of the British Institute of Archaeology at Ankara 24:117-133.

Dendrology
Charcoal